Watusi (also known as King Solomon's Mines 2) is a 1959 American adventure film, It is the sequel to the 1950 film King Solomon's Mines. The film was directed by Kurt Neumann and starring George Montgomery, Taina Elg, David Farrar and Rex Ingram. It was produced by Al Zimbalist and Donald Zimbalist. The screenplay was by James Clavell loosely based on the 1885 novel King Solomon's Mines by H. Rider Haggard.

Plot summary

The film opens in the British Protectorate of Tanganyika in 1919, shortly after the conclusion of World War I.  Harry Quatermain (George Montgomery) is the son of Allan Quatermain who first set out on the quest for the source of Solomon's wealth, and he is determined to succeed where his father failed. He goes to Africa with his good friend Rick Cobb (David Farrar) and as they continue on their journey, Erica Neuler (Taina Elg) joins them. She is the daughter of a missionary who has been killed by a local tribe. Harry cannot hide his antagonism toward Erica. She is German, and Harry's mother and sister were killed at sea by Germans in World War I when their vessel was attacked by a U-boat, afterwards Harry had to identify their bodies, and he has harbored anti-German sentiments ever since doing so.

Cast
 George Montgomery as Harry Quatermain 
 Taina Elg as Erica Neuler 
 David Farrar as Rick Cobb 
 Rex Ingram as Umbopa 
 Dan Seymour as Mohamet 
 Robert Goodwin as Jim-Jim 
 Anthony M. Davis as Amtaga 
 Paul Thompson as Gagool 
 Harold Dyrenforth as Wilhelm von Kentner 
 Charles Swain as M'ban 
 Martin Wilkins as Wounded Native

Production
The film was originally known as Return to King Solomon's Mines and was the first movie produced for the studio by Al Zimbalist since he signed a contract with them.  Director Kurt Neumann had just made The Fly (1958) which was written by James Clavell and Clavell wrote the screenplay for this. Taina Elg was under contract to MGM at the time and had just made Les Girls for them.

The film reuses some footage from a previous MGM adaptation of the novel, King Solomon's Mines (1950) starring Deborah Kerr and Stewart Granger.

During filming, Irma Neumann, wife of director Kurt, died. A few weeks after filming completed, the director himself died as well.

Reception

Box office
According to MGM records the film earned $695,000 in the US and Canada and $850,000 elsewhere resulting in a profit of $79,000.

References

External links
 
 
 
 Zone Troopers: Website about the different Allan Quatermain and King Solomon's Mine films

1959 films
Films set in Africa
1950s fantasy adventure films
American fantasy adventure films
Metro-Goldwyn-Mayer films
Films with screenplays by James Clavell
Films based on King Solomon's Mines
Films directed by Kurt Neumann
1950s English-language films
1950s American films